Ifunda is an administrative ward in the Iringa Rural district of the Iringa Region of Tanzania. In 2016 the Tanzania National Bureau of Statistics report there were 12,765 people in the ward, from 12,199 in 2012.

Villages / vitongoji 
The ward has 6 villages and 30 vitongoji.

 Ifunda
 Kibaoni A
 Kilimahewa A
 Kipera
 Mgondo
 Ulolage
 Utibesa
 Bandabichi
 Bandabichi
 Ifunda Sekondari
 Ihagaha
 Kibaoni B
 Kilimahewa B
 Kivalali A
 Kivalali B
 Mlafu
 Isupilo
 Kibena
 Isenuka
 Kwa Mama Fred
 Kalonga
 Kitasengwa
 Lutitili
 Ubalanzi
 Ulyangwada
 Mfukulembe
 Igulumiti B
 Igulumti A
 Lyasa
 Ndolela
 Udumka
 Ikungu
 Ofisini
 Utulo
 Mibikimitali
 Masimike
 Mibikimitali
 Ulangala

References 

Wards of Iringa Region